Jhatla is a village located in the Punjab Province of Pakistan. It is located at 31°48'0N 71°49'60E.

References

Union councils of Khushab District
Populated places in Khushab District